Henry Gardinn (died in Heusden or Maastricht, 1605) was an alleged sorcerer and werewolf.

Gardinn originated from Limburg. 

In 1605, he was charged with witchcraft by being a werewolf. He was accused of having transformed himself to a wolf together with two other men, one of whom was Jan Le Loup. Gardinn made a statement of confession that the three men had attacked, murdered and eaten a child in the shape of wolves. 

Henry Gardinn was judged guilty of witchcraft for being a werewolf, and was sentenced to be burned alive. 

The execution took place in either Heusden or in Maastricht. His alleged accomplice Jan Le Loup left the parish, was apprehended two years later, and executed as well.

Fiction
Henry Gardinn was used as the role model for a werewolf in the series Spike and Suzy.

See also
Gilles Garnier
Werewolf witch trials
Valais witch trials, also a combined werewolf witch trial
 Peter Stubbe
 Werewolf of Châlons

References
Fernand Vanhemelryck, Het gevecht met de duivel, Heksen in Vlaanderen, Davidsfonds Leuven, 1999, 338 p. 

People executed for witchcraft
Executed Belgian people
1605 deaths
Year of birth unknown
People executed by burning
People of the Spanish Netherlands
Werewolves